Domingo Romeo Jaime was one of the pioneers of Cuban Scouting. The first troops of Boy Scouts in Cuba met under the sponsorship of the American Legion, the Mother's Club del Vedado and the electric generating plant of the Compañía Cubana de Electricidad. Angel Loustalot, the son of Jules Loustalot, was commissioner for other pioneers of the Scout Movement, Enrique Quintana, Dr. Moisés Boudé, Domingo Romeo Jaime and Oscar Poey Bonachea.

References

External links
https://web.archive.org/web/20081010165028/http://www.babalublog.com/archives/001452.html
https://web.archive.org/web/20120425015229/http://www.economiaparatodos.com.ar/ver_nota.php?nota=657
http://www.wikipowell.org/Escultismo_en_Cuba
https://web.archive.org/web/20050827232012/http://www.scoutdecuba.org/
http://historiadelosscouts.blogspot.com/2007/08/historia-de-los-scouts-de-cuba-desde-su.html
https://web.archive.org/web/20091005031908/http://www.vimeo.com/4944959El Escultismo cubano on Vimeo

Scouting pioneers
Scouting and Guiding in Cuba
Year of birth missing